Vacation Playhouse is an American anthology television series that was broadcast during the summer months on CBS from July 22, 1963, to August 21, 1967.

Premise

Vacation Playhouse premiered on July 22, 1963, on CBS. The show aired as a summer replacement for CBS's sitcom The Lucy Show. A voiceover introduced each episode with "While Lucy's on vacation . . . it's Vacation Playhouse".

The series was a showcase for previously unaired unsold television pilot films. When it replaced The Lucy Show in 1963, 1964, 1966, and 1967, its episodes were comedies. In 1965, it replaced Gomer Pyle, U.S.M.C. with episodes of drama and adventure. 

The final episode aired Monday, August 21, 1967 after four years and five seasons.

Production notes

The series was directed by actors Don Taylor, and Richard Crenna and television producer/director Jack Donohue. The series was produced by producers Hal Kanter, Arthur Julian and Donohue.

The series was filmed alternatively between the Desilu Studios and Television City. The series was also produced with the association of Bing Crosby Productions, Desilu Productions, Four Star Television, and Universal Television.

Broadcast history

Vacation Playhouse aired on Mondays from 8:30-9PM during its first and second seasons. During its third season, (1965), the series aired on Friday nights from 9:30-10PM. It returned to its previous time slot  on Monday nights in 1966 and for a final run  in the summer of 1967.

Episodes

Season 1

A Love Affair Just for Three – July 22, 1963
Three Wishes – July 29, 1963
Hide and Seek – August 5, 1963
Mickey and the Contessa – August 12, 1963
The Big Brain – August 19, 1963
Swingin' Together – August 26, 1963
All About Barbara – September 2, 1963
Hooray for Love – September 9, 1963
Come a-Runnin''' – September 16, 1963Maggie Brown – September 23, 1963

Season 2Hey, Teacher – June 15, 1964Hooray for Hollywood – June 22, 1964Papa G.I. – June 29, 1964I and Claude – July 6, 1964He's All Yours – July 20, 1964Love is a Lion's Roar – July 27, 1964At Your Service – August 3, 1964The Graduation Dress – August 10, 1964The First Hundred Years – August 17, 1964My Darling Judge – August 31, 1964The Bean Show – September 7, 1964The Ivy League – September 14, 1964

Season 3Sybil – June 20, 1965Alec Tate – June 27, 1965The Barbara Rush Show – July 4, 1965Patrick Stone – July 11, 1965Starr (aka – "Starr, First Baseman" or "Starr of the Yankees") – July 18, 1965The Brave Duke – July 25, 1965Luke and the Tenderfoot Part I – August 6, 1965Luke and the Tenderfoot Part II – August 13, 1965Coogan's Reward – August 15, 1965Three on an Island – August 22, 1965Cap'n Ahab – August 29, 1965Down Home – September 5, 1965

Season 4The Good Old Days – July 11, 1966Frank Merriwell – July 25, 1966Where's There Smokey – August 1, 1966My Lucky Penny – August 8, 1966The Hoofer – August 15, 1966My Son, the Doctor – August 22, 1966The Two of Us – August 29, 1966Off We Go! – September 5, 1966

Season 5You're Only Young Twice – July 3, 1967My Boy Goggle – July 24, 1967Alfred of the Amazon – July 31, 1967Heaven Help Us – August 14, 1967The Jones Boys – August 21, 1967

 

References

External links''

1963 American television series debuts
1967 American television series endings
1960s American comedy-drama television series
1960s American anthology television series
American live television series
Black-and-white American television shows
CBS original programming
English-language television shows
Television series about vacationing